Pelion is a town in Lexington County, South Carolina, United States. The population was 674 at the 2010 census. It is part of the Columbia, South Carolina Metropolitan Statistical Area.

History
A post office called Pelion has been in operation since 1900. The town was named after Mt Pelion in Greece.

Geography
Pelion is located at  (33.765562, -81.246472).

According to the United States Census Bureau, the town has a total area of 3.6 square miles (9.2 km2), of which 3.5 square miles (9.0 km2) is land and 0.1 square mile (0.3 km2) (2.81%) is water.

Demographics

As of the census of 2000, there were 553 people, 192 households, and 147 families residing in the town. The population density was 159.7 people per square mile (61.7/km2). There were 211 housing units at an average density of 60.9 per square mile (23.5/km2). The racial makeup of the town was 96.75% White, 0.72% African American, 0.18% Native American, 0.90% Asian, 0.54% from other races, and 0.90% from two or more races. Hispanic or Latino of any race were 2.17% of the population.

There were 192 households, out of which 42.2% included children under the age of 18 living with them, 66.1% were married couples living together, 7.8% had a female householder with no husband present, and 23.4% were non-families. 20.3% of all households were made up of individuals, and 9.4% had someone living alone who was 65 years of age or older. The average household size was 2.69 and the average family size was 3.14.

In the town, the population was spread out, with 27.5% under the age of 18, 8.3% from 18 to 24, 28.8% from 25 to 44, 21.9% from 45 to 64, and 13.6% who were 65 years of age or older. The median age was 35 years. For every 100 females, there were 84.9 males. For every 100 females age 18 and over, there were 81.4 males.

The median income for a household in the town was $42,222, and the median income for a family was $47,917. Males had a median income of $31,696 versus $25,769 for females. The per capita income for the town was $14,838. About 6.1% of families and 12.1% of the population were below the poverty line, including 7.9% of those under age 18 and 17.5% of those age 65 or over.

Education
Pelion has a public library, a branch of the Lexington County Public Library.

Notable residence
 Paul Benjamin - actor born in Pelion
Dalton Freeman - NFL player
Michael Graham - radio personality, American talk radio host and columnist born and raised in Pelion
 A rescued White-Tailed Deer named "Mr Roscoe P. Coltrane" lives with and provided support for the woman who rescued him while her father battled dementia.

References

Towns in Lexington County, South Carolina
Towns in South Carolina
Columbia metropolitan area (South Carolina)